Tudor Ciortea (28 November 1903 – 13 October 1982) was a Romanian composer, musicologist, and music educator.

Life and career
Ciortea was born in Brașov and began his music studies under Gheorghe Dima in Cluj. He went on to study at the Bucharest Conservatory (now the National University of Music) under  Ion Nonna Otescu and in Paris under Nadia Boulanger and Paul Dukas. He lived most of his life in Bucharest where he taught for over thirty years at the Bucharest Conservatory. Amongst his students there were the composers Liana Alexandra, Irina Odagescu, Maya Badian, and Carmen Petra-Basacopol.

His compositions concentrated on chamber music and art song and were influenced by the French chamber music tradition and the traditional folksongs of Transylvania. According to Nicolas Slonimsky, Ciortea's best chamber music was remarkable for its "contrapuntal complexity." In 1964, Ciortea won the "George Enescu prize" of the Romanian Academy for his octet Din isprăvile lui Păcală (Some of Păcală's Exploits).

The Tudor Ciortea Memorial House in Brașov contains some of his personal effects and instruments as well as a portrait of his wife, the dancer and choreographer  Vera Proca-Ciortea. The music school, Liceul de Muzica "Tudor Ciortea", in Brașov is named in his honour as is the city's annual chamber music festival.

References

External links
Tudor Ciortea Memorial House in Brașov

Romanian classical composers
20th-century classical composers
People from Brașov
1903 births
1982 deaths
National University of Music Bucharest alumni
Academic staff of the National University of Music Bucharest
Male classical composers
Enescu Prize winners
20th-century male musicians